The 2011–12 Austrian Hockey League was a season of the Austrian Hockey League (known as Erste Bank Eishockey Liga - or EBEL league - for sponsorship reasons). The Black Wings Linz won their second Austrian championship after 2003 by defeating the EC KAC in the Playoff-Final four games to one.

Teams

Regular season

Regular season
After 40 regular season games, the league was divided into two mid-season groups, who played games amongst each other. The first six teams qualified into the playoffs, but played a further 10 games each in the Placement Round to decide the best rankings. Earlier points were annulled, except for the 1st team receiving +4, the 2nd +3, the 3rd + 2, and the 4th +1 extra initial point(s) for this phase.

The last 5 teams played 8 games each in the Qualifying Round to reach the remaining two playoff spots. Earlier points were annulled except for the 7th receiving + 3, the 8th + 2, and the 9th + 1 extra initial point(s) for this phase. In the playoff games the better placed team at the end of these mid-season groups will have the right to play at home first. In the quarterfinals the 1st ranked team will play against the 8th ranked team, 2nd vs 7th, 3rd vs 6th, 4th vs 5th - each in a best-of-seven series.

Placement Round
EHC Black Wings Linz started with +4, KHL Medveščak Zagreb with +3, EC Red Bull Salzburg with +2 and EC KAC with +1 points.

Qualifying round
Villacher SV started with +3, Vienna Capitals with + 2 and the Graz 99ers with +1 points.

Playoffs
In the semifinals the four winners of the quarterfinals will play as follows: the best ranked club (in the regular season) of the four semifinalists will play against the worst ranked club, the second best ranked club against the second worst ranked club - each in a best-of-seven series. The two winners of the semifinals will play a best-of-seven series in the final round.

If a playoff game is undecided at the end of the regular time after a 17 minutes break a 20-minute "Sudden Victory Overtime" will be played. Should the game still be undecided after the first overtime period after another 17 minutes break a second 20-minute "Sudden Victory Overtime" will be played and so on until the deciding goal is scored. Each team may only use four skaters; however, at least three skaters must be used.

External links

References

Austrian Hockey League seasons
Aus
1
Aus
2011–12 in Czech ice hockey
2011–12 in Hungarian ice hockey
2011–12 in Croatian ice hockey